Joshua Patrick Inglis (born 4 March 1995) is an Australian cricketer. Inglis was born in Leeds, England, and moved to Australia with his family when he was 14. He made his international debut for the Australia cricket team in February 2022.

Biography
Inglis made his first-class debut for Cricket Australia XI against the West Indians during their tour of Australia in December 2015. He made his List A debut for Cricket Australia XI against Pakistanis during their tour of Australia in January 2017. He made his Twenty20 debut for Perth Scorchers in the 2017–18 Big Bash League season on 23 December 2017.

In October 2020, in the opening round of the 2020–21 Sheffield Shield season, Inglis scored his maiden first-class century, with 153 not out against South Australia. In March 2021, Inglis was signed by Leicestershire County Cricket Club to play in the 2021 T20 Blast tournament in England. In June 2021, Inglis scored his first century in a T20 match, with 103 not out for Leicestershire. He scored his second T20 century, against Worcestershire, with an unbeaten 118 from 61 balls.

In August 2021, Inglis was named in Australia's squad for the 2021 ICC Men's T20 World Cup, in his maiden call-up to the national team. In January 2022, Inglis was named in Australia's Twenty20 International (T20I) squad for their series against Sri Lanka. Inglis made his T20I debut on 11 February 2022, for Australia against Sri Lanka. Later the same month, Inglis was named in Australia's One Day International (ODI) squad for their tour of Pakistan. In April 2022, Inglis was also named in Australia's ODI squad for their tour of Sri Lanka. He made his ODI debut on 24 June 2022, for Australia against Sri Lanka.

References

External links
 

1995 births
Living people
Australian cricketers
Australia One Day International cricketers
Australia Twenty20 International cricketers
Cricket Australia XI cricketers
Cricketers from Leeds
Western Australia cricketers
Perth Scorchers cricketers
English emigrants to Australia
London Spirit cricketers
Leicestershire cricketers